Edward G. Allen (December 4, 1859 – April 16, 1917) was an American sailor serving in the United States Navy during Boxer Rebellion who received the Medal of Honor for bravery.

Biography
Allen was born in Amsterdam, the Netherlands, and after entering the navy Allen was sent to China to fight in the Boxer Rebellion. He died on April 16, 1917, and is buried in the Evergreens Cemetery Brooklyn, New York.

Medal of Honor citation 
War Department, General Orders No. 55 (July 19, 1901):

See also

 List of Medal of Honor recipients
 List of Medal of Honor recipients for the Boxer Rebellion

References

External links
  

1859 births
1917 deaths
United States Navy Medal of Honor recipients
United States Navy chiefs
Dutch emigrants to the United States
American military personnel of the Boxer Rebellion
Foreign-born Medal of Honor recipients
Boxer Rebellion recipients of the Medal of Honor